The 1952 Republican National Convention was held at the International Amphitheatre in Chicago, Illinois from July 7 to 11, 1952, and nominated the popular general and war hero Dwight D. Eisenhower of New York, nicknamed "Ike," for president and the anti-communist crusading Senator from California, Richard M. Nixon, for vice president.

The Republican platform pledged to end the unpopular war in Korea, supported the development of nuclear weapons as a deterrence strategy, to fire all "the loafers, incompetents and unnecessary employees" at the State Department, condemned the Roosevelt and Truman administrations' economic policies, supported retention of the Taft–Hartley Act, opposed "discrimination against race, religion or national origin", supported "Federal action toward the elimination of lynching", and pledged to bring an end to communist subversion in the United States.

Presidential candidates

Withdrew before the convention 
 Businessman Riley A. Bender of Illinois
 Former Governor George T. Mickelson of South Dakota
 Representative Thomas H. Werdel of California
 Senator Wayne Morse of Oregon

Candidates at the convention

Keynote speech 
The keynote speech was delivered by MacArthur, who had become a hero to Republicans after President Truman relieved him of command in 1951 because of their disagreement about how to prosecute the Korean War, and had hopes of obtaining the presidential nomination. In his address, MacArthur condemned the Truman administration for America's perceived loss of status on the international stage, including criticism of the Yalta Conference and the administration's handling of the war in Korea. MacArthur also criticized Truman on the domestic front, blaming his administration for wages that failed to keep pace with post-World War II inflation. The speech was not well received, and did nothing to aid MacArthur's presidential campaign. He curtailed his post-convention speeches and remained out of the public eye until after the election.

The balloting 

The contest for the presidential nomination was expected to be a battle between the party's moderate to liberal and conservative wings. Moderate and liberal Republicans (the "Eastern Establishment"), led by New York Governor Thomas E. Dewey, the party's unsuccessful presidential nominee in 1944 and 1948, were largely supporters of Eisenhower or Warren. The conservative wing was led by Taft, who had unsuccessfully tried for the presidential nomination in 1940 and 1948.

In a pre-convention fight over the seating of delegates, Eisenhower supporters charged the Taft campaign with improperly seeking to obtain delegates from Texas, Georgia and Louisiana, states that were part of the Democratic Party's "Solid South" where Republicans had little or no organization because they traditionally did not do well in general elections. The Taft-dominated Republican National Committee supported Taft in the dispute. When delegate committees met to consider the issue before the convention convened, they sustained Eisenhower's position. Stripped of 42 delegates from the disputed states, Taft's backers realized their chances of beating Eisenhower were slim.

In his remarks during the delegate fight, Taft supporter Everett Dirksen harshly criticized Dewey and the moderate to liberal wing of the party, which had dominated it since 1940. In describing the party's failed presidential campaigns of 1940, 1944 and 1948, he pointed at Dewey, who was seated with the New York delegation, and shouted "We followed you before and you took us down the road to defeat!" Dirksen's condemnation of Dewey touched off sustained anti-Dewey and pro-Taft demonstrations.

Dirksen nominated Taft. Eisenhower was nominated by Maryland Governor Theodore McKeldin, who made obvious overtures to the conservative wing by mentioning Eisenhower's Midwestern Kansas roots and the fact that he had begun attendance at the United States Military Academy during the presidential administration of Robert Taft's father, William Howard Taft. McKeldin described Eisenhower's career at the highest levels of the military as evidence that he was able to assume the responsibilities of the presidency immediately and his international renown as an asset that would enable the party to unify its disparate wings and make inroads among Democratic and independent voters. McKeldin's nomination was seconded by Kansas Governor Edward F. Arn, Oregon Republican Party Chairman Robert A. Elliott, Mrs. Alberta Green, a delegate from West Plains, Missouri, and Hobson R. Reynolds, a state legislator from Philadelphia.

After the nominations were completed, including speeches on behalf of Earl Warren, Harold Stassen, and Douglas MacArthur, the delegates proceeded to vote. After the first ballot, Eisenhower had 595 votes, nine short of the nomination, which required 604. Taft had 500, Warren 81, Stassen 20, and MacArthur 10. Warren's backers refused to change their votes to Eisenhower because they still hoped for a deadlock that might enable Warren to obtain the nomination as a compromise choice. Stassen had not received 10 percent of the vote, which freed his home state Minnesota delegates from their pledge to support him. Most of the Stassen delegates, led by Warren E. Burger, changed their votes to Eisenhower, which gave him 614 votes and the presidential nomination. Other delegations then began to switch to Eisenhower, and the revised first ballot total was:

After the revised totals were announced, Taft and Warren supporters moved to unanimously nominate Eisenhower, which the delegates did. As soon as Eisenhower was nominated, he visited Taft personally to request his endorsement and obtain a promise that Taft would support the Republican ticket. Taft immediately agreed, and loyally backed Eisenhower during the general election campaign.

Vice presidential nomination 
Senator Richard M. Nixon's speech at a state Republican Party fundraiser in New York City on May 8, 1952 impressed Governor Thomas E. Dewey, who was an Eisenhower supporter and had formed a pro-Eisenhower delegation from New York to attend the national convention. In a private meeting after the speech, Dewey suggested to Nixon that he would make a suitable vice presidential candidate on the ticket with Eisenhower.

Nixon attended the convention as a delegate pledged to Earl Warren and represented California on the convention's platform committee. In pre-convention remarks to reporters, Nixon touted Warren as the most prominent dark horse and suggested that if Warren was not the presidential nominee, Nixon's Senate colleague William Knowland would be a good choice for vice president. As the convention proceedings continued, Warren became concerned that Nixon was working for Eisenhower while ostensibly pledged to Warren. Warren asked Paul H. Davis of the Hoover Institution at Stanford University, who had been a vice president at Columbia University while Eisenhower was the school's president, to tell Eisenhower that Warren resented such actions and wanted them to stop. Eisenhower informed Davis that he did not oppose Warren, because if Taft and Eisenhower deadlocked, then Warren would be his first choice for the nomination. In the same conversation, Eisenhower indicated that if he won the nomination, Nixon would be his first choice for the vice presidency, because Eisenhower believed the party needed to promote leaders who were aggressive, capable, and young. Eisenhower later developed a list of seven potential candidates, with Nixon's name at the top.

After Eisenhower was nominated, his key supporters met to discuss vice presidential possibilities. Eisenhower informed the group's chairman, Herbert Brownell Jr. that he did not wish to appear to dictate to the convention by formally sponsoring a single candidate, so the group reviewed several, including Taft, Everett Dirksen, and Alfred E. Driscoll, all of whom they quickly rejected. Dewey then raised Nixon's name; the group quickly concurred. Brownell checked with Eisenhower, who indicated his approval. Brownell then called Nixon to inform him that he was Eisenhower's choice. Nixon accepted, then departed for Eisenhower's hotel room to discuss the details of the campaign and Eisenhower's plans for his vice president if the ticket was successful in the general election.

The delegates soon assembled to formalize the selection. Nixon asked Knowland to nominate him, and Knowland agreed. After Taft supporter John W. Bricker declined Nixon's request to second the nomination, Driscoll agreed to do so. There were no other candidates, and Nixon was nominated by acclamation.

Television coverage 

The 1952 Republican convention was the first political convention to be televised live, coast-to-coast. Experiments in regionally broadcasting conventions took place during the Republican and Democratic conventions in 1948; however, 1952 was the first year in which networks carried nationwide coverage of political conventions. Fixed cameras were placed at the back and the sides of the International Amphitheatre for the press to use collectively. None of these offered a straight shot of the podium on stage, so many networks supplemented their coverage with shots from their own portable cameras.

The impact of the Republican Convention broadcast was an immediate one. After carefully watching the Republican Convention, the Democratic Party made last-minute alterations to their convention held in the same venue to make their broadcast more appealing to television audiences. They constructed a tower in the center of the convention hall to allow for a better shot of the podium, and Democrats exercised more control over camera shots and the conduct of delegates in front of the cameras.

By 1956, the effect of television further affected both the Republican and Democratic conventions. Conventions were compacted in length, with daytime sessions being largely eliminated and the amount of welcoming speeches and parliamentary organization speeches being decreased (such as seconding speeches for vice-presidential candidates, which were eliminated). Additionally, conventions were given overlying campaign themes, and their sessions were scheduled in order to maximize exposure to prime-time audience. To provide a more telegenic broadcast, convention halls were decked out in banners and other decorations, and television cameras were positioned at more flattering angles.

See also 
 History of the United States Republican Party
 List of Republican National Conventions
 1952 Democratic National Convention
 U.S. presidential nominating convention
 U.S. presidential election, 1952

References

Further reading

External links 
 Republican Party platform of 1952 at The American Presidency Project
 Eisenhower nomination acceptance speech for President at RNC (transcript) at The American Presidency Project
 Video of Eisenhower nomination acceptance speech for President at RNC from C-SPAN (via YouTube)
 Audio of Eisenhower nomination acceptance speech for President at RNC

Republican National Convention
Political conventions in Chicago
Republican National Conventions
Republican National
Republican National Convention
Republican National Convention